Mr. Brooks is a 2007 American psychological thriller film directed by Bruce A. Evans starring Kevin Costner, Demi Moore, Dane Cook, and William Hurt. It was released on June 1, 2007. The film follows the eponymous character, a celebrated Portland businessman and serial killer (Costner) who is forced to take on a protégé (Cook) after being blackmailed, and has to contend with his bloodthirsty alter ego (Hurt) who convinces him to indulge his "habit". His life grows even more complicated when a driven police officer (Moore) reopens the investigation into his murders. The film received mixed reviews and grossed $48.1 million against a $20 million budget.

Plot
Earl Brooks, a respected businessman in Portland, Oregon, leads a secret life as a serial killer. Despite his effort to curb his "killing addiction," Brooks succumbs to his id, Marshall, and kills a young couple in their bedroom. As part of his psychopathology, Brooks leaves each victim's bloody thumbprint on a lampshade, an act that spawned the nickname the "Thumbprint Killer". He follows a meticulous modus operandi, including fastidious preparation, cleansing the crime scene, posing the bodies, and even locking doors before departing. Brooks realizes later that the bedroom curtains were open during the murder, the window facing an apartment building.

Brooks' daughter, Jane, unexpectedly arrives home and asks for a job at his company, having dropped out of college. Later, Brooks learns that Jane is pregnant. Soon after, the Brooks are visited by Palo Alto detectives investigating a murder in Jane's former campus dorm. Brooks realizes that Jane committed the murder. He briefly considers allowing her to be caught to "save her" from becoming like him. He changes his mind and commits a similar murder in Palo Alto to provide Jane with an alibi.

A man calling himself "Mister Smith" approaches Brooks. Having a direct view at the murdered couple's bedroom, Smith took pictures of Brooks' crime. He demands to accompany Brooks during a murder. Brooks reluctantly agrees, warning Smith that killing can become addictive.

Detective Tracy Atwood interviews Smith and several other residents living across from the latest crime scene. Brooks learns Atwood is undergoing a difficult divorce from her husband, Jesse Vialo. He decides that Vialo and his lawyer/lover, Sheila, will be Smith's first victims. At the scene of the Vialo murder, Smith wets his pants.

Leaving the scene, Smith holds Brooks at gunpoint in panic. Brooks admits to being suicidal, having found his urges irrepressible. At a cemetery, Brooks tells Smith to kill him and dispose of his body in an open grave, sparing his family the shame of his crimes. Smith pulls the trigger. However, Brooks had previously tampered with the gun on the off-chance that he changes his mind. Brooks, deciding he wants to live and see his grandchild, kills Smith and hides his body in the open grave.

With the photos already destroyed, there is no evidence tying Brooks to the crimes. With Smith's urine the only DNA evidence tied to the Thumbprint Killer, the investigation is off Brooks' trail.

Brooks anonymously calls Detective Atwood, whom he has come to admire. The brief conversation makes Atwood suspect Smith is not the Thumbprint Killer. That night, Brooks has a nightmare in which Jane murders him.

Cast

 Kevin Costner as Earl Brooks/The Thumbprint Killer
 Demi Moore as Detective Tracy Atwood
 Dane Cook as Graves Baffert/Mr Smith
 William Hurt as Marshall, Brooks' id
 Marg Helgenberger as Emma Brooks
 Ruben Santiago-Hudson as Detective Hawkins
 Danielle Panabaker as Jane Brooks
 Aisha Hinds as Nancy Hart
 Lindsay Crouse as Captain Lister
 Jason Lewis as Jesse Vialo
 Reiko Aylesworth as Sheila
 Matt Schulze as Thornton Meeks/The Hangman
 Yasmine Delawari as Sunday
 Traci Dinwiddie as Sarah Leaves
 Michael Cole as Atwood's lawyer
 Laura Bailey as flight attendant

Reception

Box office
Mr. Brooks opened in 2,453 theaters and grossed $10,017,067, with an average of $4,083 per theater and ranking #4 at the North American box office. The film ultimately grossed $28,549,298 domestically and $19,572,602 internationally for a total of $48,121,900 worldwide, above its $20 million budget.

Critical response
Mr. Brooks received mixed reviews from film critics. On Rotten Tomatoes, a review aggregator, the film has a score of 55% based on 161 reviews with an average rating of 5.70/10. The critical consensus states "The set-up is intriguing, but Mr. Brooks overstuffs itself with twists and sub-plots, becoming more preposterous as it goes along."  Costner and Hurt were both praised for their performances. The film also has a score of 45 out of 100 on Metacritic based on 34 critics indicating "mixed or average reviews". Rolling Stone wrote that "the cop on the case, [is] played by Demi Moore with a striking directness that deserved better than being saddled with an absurd back story as an heiress with a fortune-hunting husband." Audiences polled by CinemaScore gave the film an average grade of "B−" on an A+ to F scale.

Sequel
On the director's commentary, Bruce Evans said that the film was to be the first of a trilogy, but as with any franchise it depended on the film's profits. Despite its commercial success, there are no plans to make further films. Speaking in April 2009, Panabaker said, "Everybody wanted to make a trilogy. I saw Kevin [Costner] last summer and we still would love to. The idea of my character and Kevin's character, it'd be so much fun. I think you got to see how manipulative they both are with each other. I would have loved to have done three."

Speaking with Jason Jenkins at Bloody Disgusting in 2020, Evans further elaborated on what the follow-ups might have entailed.  "'Someone would have kidnapped his family, having no idea who they were dealing with,' Evans notes, pointing out that the kidnappers would not only be contending with the murderous Brooks, but his burgeoning psychopath of a daughter as well."  Mr Evans noted that Brooks' id Marshall would have returned, and have been "killed" by Brooks at some point in the second film, eventually being resurrected and returning “angrier and more perverse”.  Furthermore, Mr Evans revealed that the third film, which would have found Brooks and Jane at odds with one another, would have ended with Brooks killing both himself and his daughter, having realized that there is no hope for either of them.

Home media
The film was released on October 23, 2007, on both high-definition Blu-ray Disc and standard-definition DVD.

Soundtrack
 

The film score for Mr. Brooks was composed by Ramin Djawadi. The soundtrack album was released on May 22, 2007.

The film's soundtrack features Ramin Djawadi's score and the song "Vicious Traditions" by The Veils. Ramin Djawadi was nominated for the World Soundtrack Award in category Discovery of the Year in 2007. English metalcore band Asking Alexandria wrote a song based on the film entitled "Hey There Mr. Brooks" for their 2009 debut album Stand Up And Scream.

References

External links

2007 films
2007 psychological thriller films
2000s English-language films
2000s police procedural films
2000s serial killer films
American police detective films
American psychological thriller films
American serial killer films
Fictional portrayals of the Portland Police Bureau
Films scored by Ramin Djawadi
Films set in Portland, Oregon
Films shot in Portland, Oregon
Metro-Goldwyn-Mayer films
Relativity Media films
2000s American films